Jeff Jacobson may refer to:
 Jeff Jacobson (politician), Ohio State Senator
 Jeff Jacobson (photographer) (1946-2020), American photographer
 Jeff Jacobson (CEO), former CEO of Xerox Corporation
 Jeffrey E. Jacobson, American lawyer